Valea Ursului is a commune in Neamț County, Western Moldavia, Romania. It is composed of five villages: Bucium, Chilii, Giurgeni, Muncelu de Jos, and Valea Ursului.

The commune lies on the Central Moldavian Plateau, on the banks of the Bârlad River, which has its source here.

Natives
 Ecaterina Nazare

References

Communes in Neamț County
Localities in Western Moldavia